C. C. Hunter is the American author of the Shadow Falls young adult novels. She also writes fantasy novels about different creatures. C.C. Hunter is a pen name. Under her real name, Christie Craig, she  writes romantic suspense novels.

Bibliography

As C.C. Hunter

The Shadow Falls Series
 Born at Midnight, St. Martin's Press, 2011
 Awake at Dawn, St. Martin's Press, 2011
 Taken at Dusk, St. Martin's Press, 2012
 Whispers at Moonrise, St. Martin's Press, 2012
 Chosen at Nightfall, St. Martin's Press, 2013
 Midnight Hour, St. Martin's Press, 2016

The Shadow Falls: After Dark Series
 Reborn, St. Martin's Press, 2014
 Eternal, St. Martin's Press, 2014
 Unspoken, St. Martin's Press, 2015

Shadow Falls Novellas
 Turned at Dark, St. Martin's Press, 2011 (A Shadow Falls Short Story)
 Saved at Sunrise, St. Martin's Press, 2013 (A Shadow Falls Novella)
 Unbreakable, St. Martin's Press, 2014 (A Shadow Falls Novella)
 Spellbinder, St. Martin's Press, 2015 (A Shadow Falls Novella)
 Almost Midnight, St. Martin's Press, 2016 (Compilation of all the Shadow Falls novellas; plus an extra called Fierce)

The Mortician’s Daughter Trilogy
 One Foot In The Grave, BookEnds, 2017
 Two Feet Under, Ever After Romance, 2018
 Three Heartbeats Away, Independent, 2019

Stand-alone
 This Heart of Mine, 2018 
In Another Life, 2019

As Christie Craig

Fiction
 Divorced, Desperate and Delicious, Love Spell, 2007 
 Divorced, Desperate and Dating, Love Spell, 2008
 Weddings Can Be Murder, Love Spell, 2008
 Divorced, Desperate and Deceived, Dorchester, 2009
 Gotcha, Love Spell, 2009
 Shut Up and Kiss Me, Love Spell, 2010
 Don’t Mess with Texas (Only in Texas), Grand Central Publishing, 2011
 Murder, Mayhem and Mama, 2011
 Blame It on Texas, 2012

Nonfiction
 The Everything Guide to Writing a Romance Novel, Adams Media, 2008
 Wild, Wicked & Wanton: 101 Ways to Love Like You're In a Romance Novel, Adams Media, 2010

References

External links

Living people
American women children's writers
American children's writers
Date of birth missing (living people)
American writers of young adult literature
Women writers of young adult literature
Year of birth missing (living people)
21st-century pseudonymous writers
Pseudonymous women writers
21st-century American women